Martin Amedick (born 6 September 1982) is a German retired professional footballer who plays as a centre back.

Career statistics
.

Honours

Club 
 Borussia Dortmund
 DFB-Pokal runner-up: 2007–08

References

External links
 

1982 births
German footballers
Living people
Sportspeople from Paderborn
Footballers from North Rhine-Westphalia
Eintracht Braunschweig players
Arminia Bielefeld players
SC Paderborn 07 players
Borussia Dortmund players
Borussia Dortmund II players
1. FC Kaiserslautern players
Eintracht Frankfurt players
Bundesliga players
2. Bundesliga players
Association football defenders